Sternula is a genus of small white terns. It is often subsumed into the larger genus Sterna, although the most recent changes to the AOU checklist considers it a separate genus. 
The genus name is a diminutive of ''Sterna, "tern".

Species
Listed alphabetically.

Saunders's and least terns were both formerly considered to be subspecies of little tern.

References

 
Bird genera
Taxa named by Friedrich Boie